Shadow Projects is a dormant television company best known for making preschool television series with puppetry. Founded by Mitchell Kriegman in 1986, the company created and produced Bear in the Big Blue House, Breakfast with Bear and The Book of Pooh for Playhouse Disney.

History
Shadow Projects was founded in 1986 by Mitchell Kriegman, creating shows like Bear in the Big Blue House, The Book of Pooh, and Breakfast with Bear.  The company's mascot was a barking dog silhouette.

TV Shows
 Bear in the Big Blue House (1997–2006)
 The Book of Pooh (2001–2004)

References

External links
 Archive of official website

Television companies of the United States
Mass media companies based in New York City
Mass media companies established in 1986
Mass media companies disestablished in 2008
1986 establishments in New York (state)
2008 disestablishments in New York (state)
Defunct companies based in New York (state)